Víctor Ismael Sosa (born 18 January 1987 in San Martín, Buenos Aires) is an Argentine professional footballer for Liga MX club Pachuca.

Nicknamed Chuco, Sosa is a dynamic forward who can play as either a striker, second striker or winger, due to his ability to score and assist goals. He holds a Mexican passport.

Club career

Independiente
Sosa began his playing career in 2005 with Independiente. He made his league debut on 20 March 2005 in a 2–1 away defeat to Boca Juniors. In 2006, he had a loan spell with San Martín de San Juan but returned to the Independiente where he played until 2009 making 80 league appearances and scoring 13 goals.

During the 2009 winter transfer window he joined Argentinos Juniors under new manager Claudio Borghi where he started well with 3 goals in his first 6 games for the club. His good form in the Apertura 2009 helped the club to a creditable 6th-place finish and in the  Clausura 2010 he was the top scorer for the club with 9 goals in 17 appearances helping the club to win the Primera División for the first time since 1985.

Gaziantepspor
Sosa was given the number 18 shirt at Kamil Ocak Stadium. He made his first Süper Lig appearance on 13 July 2010, in Gaziantepspor's fourth game of the season, in the match away to Kasımpaşa. Sosa scored his first league goal for Gaziantepspor against Bucaspor.

Universidad Católica
On 7 January 2013, Sosa joined Universidad Católica.

Pumas UNAM
On December 26, 2013, Sosa was transferred to Mexican club Club Universidad Nacional. He had limited game time in his first tournament, scoring just 2 goals, but the return of Memo Vazquez saw an increase in opportunities resulting in an increased goal tally year on year. Sosa scored 5 goals in his second tournament with the club and found the net 7 times in his third tournament, the Clausera 2015. The Apertura 2015 saw Sosa become the star man for Pumas and became only the 5th pumas player to score 10 or more goals in the short tournament format, scoring 10 goals. He also added 7 assists during the regular season. On December 9, 2015 Club Universidad Nacional tied Sosa down for another three years to the club.

For the Clausura 2016 tournament Sosa scored a brace in the first home game of the season in a 3–2 win over Deportivo Toluca. He also scored in the first game of the 2016 Copa Libertadores, opening the scoring in the first minute against Emelec. A fine run of form in the Copa Libertadores saw Sosa scoring again in a 0–2 victory at Olimpia followed by a brace against Deportivo Tachira in Ciudad Universitaria.

Tigres UANL
On 18 June 2016, Sosa arrived to Monterrey  to join Tigres UANL. On 10 July, he made his debut as a starter playing against Pachuca FC in the 2016 Campeón de Campeones Cup. He scored the winning goal at 25' after a cross from Javier Aquino giving Tigres their first Campeón de Campeones championship. He scored his first goal with Tigres in Liga MX on July 30, 2016, the final goal of the 3–0 victory over América at the Estadio Azteca.

International career
Sosa was picked to join the Argentina Under-20 squad for the 2007 South American Youth Championship in Paraguay.

Honours

Club
Argentinos Juniors
Primera División Argentina: 2010 Clausura
UANL
Liga MX: 2016 Apertura, 2017 Apertura
Campeón de Campeones: 2016, 2017, 2018
Campeones Cup: 2018

References

External links
 
 

Argentine footballers
Argentina under-20 international footballers
Argentine expatriate footballers
Association football forwards
Club Atlético Independiente footballers
San Martín de San Juan footballers
Argentinos Juniors footballers
Gaziantepspor footballers
Club Deportivo Universidad Católica footballers
Club Universidad Nacional footballers
Tigres UANL footballers
C.F. Pachuca players
Club León footballers
Argentine Primera División players
Süper Lig players
Chilean Primera División players
Liga MX players
Expatriate footballers in Turkey
Argentine expatriate sportspeople in Turkey
Expatriate footballers in Chile
Expatriate footballers in Mexico
Argentine expatriate sportspeople in Mexico
Sportspeople from Buenos Aires Province
1987 births
Living people